The Sultan Mehmed Mosque, also known as the Suleyman Agha Mosque, was an Ottoman mosque in the town of Arta, Greece, built within the Castle of Arta. It was one of the eight mosques of the town, and one of the six that no longer exist.

History 
During Ottoman times, the town of Arta had eight mosques, those being the Sultan Mehmed Mosque, the Feyzullah Mosque, the Sultan Bayazid Mosque, the Kiliç Bey Mosque, the Tekke Mosque, the Bey Mosque, the Faik Pasha Mosque and the Rokka Mosque. The first six were located within Arta proper, while the latter two were situated outside the town. Only Feyzullah and Faik Pasha survive to this day.

According to the Metropolitan of Arta, Serafeim Xenopoulos, the construction of the mosque was ordered by Sultan Mehmed II, who, upon hearing about the erection of the Faik Pasha Mosque, wished for a new, larger mosque to be built and dedicated to him, but was not satisfied with the result and ordered the works for the mosque to be halted. The mosque as finalized by a servant of Faik Pasha, Suleyman Agha. To the mosque used to belong several lands from around the villages of Vigla and Strongyli, from whose exploitation the mosque would receive its income. Xenopoulos noted that the mosque had been built on top of an earlier Christian church, from which materials were taken, which can also be discerned by the existence of Christian symbols on the mosque's plates.

Arta was annexed by the Kingdom of Greece on 24 June 1881 (O.S.). After that gradually began a deliberate reshaping of the urban plan of Arta aiming the removal of all those elements that reminded and bespoke of the town's recent Ottoman past. It is theorized that the Sultan Mehmed Mosque was one of the very first Ottoman monuments to be targeted and eventually destroyed due to its symbolic location inside the castle, while the vast majority of the rest of the reminders of the Ottoman period where left neglected to rot and collapse after the Muslim inhabitants of Arta fled.

Pictorial evidence 
One of the first known depictions of it was created by Ottoman writer Piri Reis in the fifteenth century, who drew Arta with the castle mosque, Faik Pasha Mosque and the mosque of Rokka. In 1686 Jacob Enderlin, a German engraver and publisher, created an engraving depicting Arta with Sultan Mehmed Mosque. In 1839, Panagiotis Zographos drew, under the guidance of Yannis Makriyannis, the siege of Arta in late 1821, during the Greek War of Independence. Zographos' painting shows the castle, the sprawl of the town, as well as the Sultan Mehmed, Sultan Beyazid and Kiliç Bey mosques. One of the most notable depictions was created by English writer and artist Edward Lear, who visited Arta in 1851. In his work, Lear depicted Arta with the Clock Tower, the mosques and the castle. A similar engraving was made by English engraver Edmund Evans, who visited the town in April of 1854.

Architecture 
Sultan Mehmed Mosque used to have two storeys, a brick-covered roof, and a minaret decorated with colourful stones. The exact date of its construction is not known, but it has been suggested it was built around the same time as Faik Pasha Mosque as. Its erection on the highest point of the castle made it visible from a larger distance. The location was not picked in chance, as the founding of Ottoman buildings in the most prominent positions was used as a sign of power against the Christian population of Arta. Inside the castle, near the mosque, once were houses, a barracks and prisons, while at the gate an imaret functioned which offered food to the poor for free.

Gallery

See also 

 Islam in Greece
 List of former mosques in Greece
 List of mosques in Greece
 Ottoman Greece

References

Bibliography 
 Xenopoulos, Serafeim, Δοκίμιον ιστορικής τινος περιλήψεως τής ποτε αρχαίας και εγκρίτου Ηπειρωτικής πόλεως Άρτης και της ωσαύτως νεωτέρας πόλεως Πρεβέζης / Συλλεγέν και συνταχθέν υπό του μητροπολίτου Άρτης Σεραφείμ του Βυζαντίου, Athens, 1884.

Buildings and structures in Arta, Greece
Ottoman mosques in Greece
Former mosques in Greece
Ottoman Epirus
Mosque buildings with domes
15th-century mosques
15th-century architecture in Greece
Destroyed mosques